This page lists all described species of the spider family Philodromidae accepted by the World Spider Catalog :

A

Apollophanes

Apollophanes O. Pickard-Cambridge, 1898
 A. aztecanus Dondale & Redner, 1975 — Mexico
 A. bangalores Tikader, 1963 — India
 A. caribaeus Dondale & Redner, 1975 — Trinidad
 A. crispus Dondale & Redner, 1975 — Panama
 A. erectus Dondale & Redner, 1975 — Mexico
 A. fitzroyi Baert, 2013 — Ecuador (Galapagos Is.)
 A. gaucho Francisco, Ott & Teixeira, 2016 — Brazil
 A. indistinctus Gertsch, 1933 — Mexico
 A. lonesomegeorgei Baert, 2013 — Ecuador (Galapagos Is.)
 A. longipes (O. Pickard-Cambridge, 1896) — Mexico
 A. macropalpus (Paik, 1979) — Russia (West Siberia to Far East), Korea
 A. margareta Lowrie & Gertsch, 1955 — USA, Canada
 A. punctatus (Bryant, 1948) — Hispaniola
 A. punctipes (O. Pickard-Cambridge, 1891) (type) — USA to Panama
 A. texanus Banks, 1904 — USA, Mexico

B

Bacillocnemis

Bacillocnemis Mello-Leitão, 1938
 B. anomala Mello-Leitão, 1938 (type) — Argentina

Berlandiella

Berlandiella Mello-Leitão, 1929
 B. insignis Mello-Leitão, 1929 (type) — Brazil
 B. magna Mello-Leitão, 1929 — Brazil
 B. meridionalis Lise & Silva, 2011 — Brazil
 B. polyacantha Mello-Leitão, 1929 — Brazil
 B. querencia Lise & Silva, 2011 — Brazil
 B. robertae Lise & Silva, 2011 — Brazil, Argentina
 B. zabele Pantoja, Drago-Bisneto & Saturnino, 2020 — Brazil

C

Celerrimus

Celerrimus Lecigne, Cornic, Oger & Van Keer, 2019
 C. duffeyi Lecigne, 2019 (type) — Spain, France

Cleocnemis

Cleocnemis Simon, 1886
 C. bryantae (Gertsch, 1933) — Paraguay
 C. heteropoda Simon, 1886 (type) — Brazil
 C. lanceolata Mello-Leitão, 1929 — Brazil
 C. moschata Mello-Leitão, 1943 — Brazil
 C. mutilata (Mello-Leitão, 1917) — Brazil
 C. nigra Mello-Leitão, 1943 — Brazil
 C. paraguensis (Gertsch, 1933) — Paraguay
 C. punctulata (Taczanowski, 1872) — Peru, Venezuela, Guyana
 C. rosea Mello-Leitão, 1944 — Argentina
 C. rudolphi Mello-Leitão, 1943 — Brazil
 C. serrana Mello-Leitão, 1929 — Brazil
 C. spinosa Mello-Leitão, 1947 — Brazil
 C. taquarae (Keyserling, 1891) — Peru, Brazil
 C. xenotypa Mello-Leitão, 1929 — Brazil

† Cretadromus

† Cretadromus Cheng et al., 2009
 † C. liaoningensis Cheng et al., 2009

E

Ebo

Ebo Keyserling, 1884
 E. bharatae Tikader, 1965 — India (mainland, Andaman Is.)
 E. bucklei Platnick, 1972 — Canada
 E. carmineus Mello-Leitão, 1944 — Argentina
 E. contrastus Sauer & Platnick, 1972 — USA
 E. distinctivus Lyakhov, 1992 — Kazakhstan, Russia (South Siberia)
 E. evansae Sauer & Platnick, 1972 — USA, Mexico
 E. fuscus Mello-Leitão, 1943 — Argentina
 E. iviei Sauer & Platnick, 1972 — USA, Canada
 E. latithorax Keyserling, 1884 (type) — USA, Canada
 E. meridionalis Mello-Leitão, 1942 — Argentina
 E. merkeli Schick, 1965 — USA
 E. pepinensis Gertsch, 1933 — USA, Canada
 E. punctatus Sauer & Platnick, 1972 — USA

Eminella

Eminella Özdikmen, 2007
 E. ctenops (Mello-Leitão, 1940) (type) — Argentina

† Eothanatus

† Eothanatus Petrunkevitch, 1950
 † E. diritatis Petrunkevitch, 1950

F

Fageia

Fageia Mello-Leitão, 1929
 F. amabilis Mello-Leitão, 1929 (type) — Brazil
 F. clara Mello-Leitão, 1937 — Brazil
 F. concolor Mello-Leitão, 1947 — Brazil
 F. meridionalis Mello-Leitão, 1943 — Brazil

G

Gephyrellula

Gephyrellula Strand, 1932
 G. violacea (Mello-Leitão, 1918) (type) — Brazil

Gephyrina

Gephyrina Simon, 1895
 G. alba Simon, 1895 (type) — Venezuela
 G. albimarginata Mello-Leitão, 1929 — Brazil
 G. imbecilla Mello-Leitão, 1917 — Brazil
 G. insularis Simon, 1898 — St. Vincent
 G. nigropunctata Mello-Leitão, 1929 — Brazil, Bolivia

Gephyrota

Gephyrota Strand, 1932
 G. candida (Simon, 1895) — Cambodia, Vietnam
 G. glauca (Jézéquel, 1966) — Ivory Coast
 G. limbata (L. Koch, 1875) (type) — Australia (Queensland)
 G. nigrolineata (Simon, 1909) — Vietnam
 G. pudica (Simon, 1906) — India
 G. virescens (Simon, 1906) — Sri Lanka
 G. viridipallida (Schmidt, 1956) — Cameroon

H

Halodromus

Halodromus Muster, 2009
 H. barbarae Muster, 2009 — Canary Is., Spain, Egypt, Israel, Saudi Arabia
 H. deltshevi Muster, 2009 — Yemen
 H. gershomi Muster, 2009 — Eritrea
 H. patellaris (Wunderlich, 1987) — Cape Verde Is., Canary Is., Spain, Tunisia, Israel
 H. patellidens (Levy, 1977) (type) — Cape Verde, Algeria to Middle East
 H. vanharteni Logunov, 2011 — United Arab Emirates

Hirriusa

Hirriusa Strand, 1932
 H. arenacea (Lawrence, 1927) — Namibia
 H. bidentata (Lawrence, 1927) — Namibia
 H. variegata (Simon, 1895) (type) — South Africa

M

Metacleocnemis

Metacleocnemis Mello-Leitão, 1929
 M. borgmeyeri Mello-Leitão, 1929 (type) — Brazil

P

Pagiopalus

Pagiopalus Simon, 1900
 P. apiculus Suman, 1971 — Hawaii
 P. atomarius Simon, 1900 (type) — Hawaii
 P. nigriventris Simon, 1900 — Hawaii
 P. personatus Simon, 1900 — Hawaii

Paracleocnemis

Paracleocnemis Schiapelli & Gerschman, 1942
 P. apostoli Mello-Leitão, 1945 — Argentina
 P. termalis Schiapelli & Gerschman, 1942 (type) — Argentina

Pedinopistha

Pedinopistha Karsch, 1880
 P. aculeata (Simon, 1900) — Hawaii
 P. finschi Karsch, 1880 (type) — Hawaii
 P. longula (Simon, 1900) — Hawaii
 P. schauinslandi (Simon, 1899) — Hawaii
 P. stigmatica (Simon, 1900) — Hawaii

Petrichus

Petrichus Simon, 1886
 P. cinereus Tullgren, 1901 — Argentina
 P. corticinus Mello-Leitão, 1944 — Argentina
 P. fuliginosus (Nicolet, 1849) — Chile
 P. funebris (Nicolet, 1849) — Chile
 P. griseus Berland, 1913 — Ecuador
 P. junior (Nicolet, 1849) — Chile
 P. lancearius Simon, 1905 — Argentina
 P. luteus (Nicolet, 1849) — Chile
 P. marmoratus Simon, 1886 (type) — Argentina
 P. meridionalis (Keyserling, 1891) — Brazil
 P. niveus (Simon, 1895) — Argentina, Falkland Is.
 P. ornatus Schiapelli & Gerschman, 1942 — Argentina
 P. sordidus Tullgren, 1901 — Argentina
 P. tobioides Mello-Leitão, 1941 — Argentina
 P. tullgreni Simon, 1902 — Argentina
 P. zonatus Tullgren, 1901 — Argentina

† Philodromidites

† Philodromidites Straus, 1967
 † P. hercynicus Straus, 1967

Philodromops

Philodromops Mello-Leitão, 1943
 P. coccineus Mello-Leitão, 1943 (type) — Brazil

Philodromus

Philodromus Walckenaer, 1826
 P. albicans O. Pickard-Cambridge, 1897 — Mexico
 P. albidus Kulczyński, 1911 — Europe, Turkey, Caucasus
 P. albofrenatus Simon, 1907 — Equatorial Guinea (Bioko)
 P. albolimbatus Thorell, 1895 — Myanmar
 P. alboniger Caporiacco, 1949 — Kenya
 P. aliensis Hu, 2001 — China
 P. anomalus Gertsch, 1934 — USA
 P. archettii Caporiacco, 1941 — Ethiopia
 P. arizonensis Dondale & Redner, 1969 — USA, Mexico
 P. aryy Marusik, 1991 — Russia (Urals to Far East), China
 P. ashae Gajbe & Gajbe, 1999 — India
 P. assamensis Tikader, 1962 — India, China
 P. aureolus (Clerck, 1757) (type) — Europe, Turkey, Caucasus, Russia (Europe to Central Asia and Middle Siberia), Kazakhstan, Iran, Central Asia, Mongolia, China, Korea, Japan
 P. auricomus L. Koch, 1878 — Russia (Far East), China, Korea, Japan
 P. austerus (L. Koch, 1876) — Australia (Queensland)
 P. azcursor Logunov & Huseynov, 2008 — Azerbaijan
 P. barmani Tikader, 1980 — India
 P. barrowsi Gertsch, 1934 — USA
 P. betrabatai Tikader, 1966 — India
 P. bhagirathai Tikader, 1966 — India
 P. bicornutus Schmidt & Krause, 1995 — Cape Verde Is.
 P. bigibbosus Caporiacco, 1941 — Ethiopia
 P. bigibbus (O. Pickard-Cambridge, 1876) — Egypt, Sudan, Arabia, India
 P. b. australis Lawrence, 1928 — South Africa
 P. bilineatus Bryant, 1933 — USA
 P. bimuricatus Dondale & Redner, 1968 — USA
 P. blanckei (Wunderlich, 1995) — France (Corsica), Italy (Sardinia, mainland)
 P. bonneti Karol, 1968 — Turkey
 P. borana Caporiacco, 1939 — Ethiopia
 P. bosmansi Muster & Thaler, 2004 — Algeria
 P. brachycephalus Lawrence, 1952 — South Africa
 P. breviductus Dondale & Redner, 1969 — Jamaica
 P. browningi Lawrence, 1952 — South Africa
 P. bucaensis (Logunov & Kunt, 2010) — Turkey
 P. buchari Kubcová, 2004 — Europe
 P. buxi Simon, 1884 — Europe, Russia (Europe to Far East), Kazakhstan, Iran
 P. calidus Lucas, 1846 — Algeria, Morocco, Libya
 P. californicus Keyserling, 1884 — North America
 P. cammarus Rossi, 1846 — Balkans
 P. caporiaccoi Roewer, 1951 — Kenya
 P. casseli Simon, 1900 — Mali
 P. catagraphus Simon, 1870 — Spain
 P. cavatus Dondale & Redner, 1969 — Mexico
 P. cayanus Taczanowski, 1872 — French Guiana
 P. cespitum (Walckenaer, 1802) — North America, Europe, North Africa, Turkey, Caucasus, Russia (Europe to Far East), Kazakhstan, Iran, Mongolia, China, Korea, Japan
 P. chambaensis Tikader, 1980 — India, China
 P. chamisis Schick, 1965 — USA, Mexico
 P. cinereus O. Pickard-Cambridge, 1876 — Egypt
 P. coachellae Schick, 1965 — USA, Mexico
 P. collinus C. L. Koch, 1835 — Europe, Turkey, Caucasus
 P. corradii Caporiacco, 1941 — Ethiopia
 P. cubanus Dondale & Redner, 1968 — Cuba
 P. cufrae Caporiacco, 1936 — Libya
 P. daoxianen Yin, Peng & Kim, 1999 — China
 P. decoratus Tikader, 1962 — India
 P. denisi Levy, 1977 — Egypt
 P. devhutai Tikader, 1966 — India
 P. diablae Schick, 1965 — USA
 P. digitatus Yang, Zhu & Song, 2005 — China
 P. dilatatus Caporiacco, 1940 — Ethiopia
 P. dilutus Thorell, 1875 — Ukraine, Russia (Europe)
 P. dispar Walckenaer, 1826 — Europe, Turkey, Caucasus, Russia (Europe to South Siberia), Iran. Introduced to USA, Canada
 P. distans Dondale & Redner, 1968 — USA
 P. domesticus Tikader, 1962 — India
 P. droseroides Schick, 1965 — USA
 P. dubius Caporiacco, 1933 — Libya
 P. durvei Tikader, 1980 — India
 P. emarginatus (Schrank, 1803) — Europe, Caucasus, Russia (Europe to Far East), Kazakhstan, Iran, Central Asia, Mongolia, China, Korea, Japan
 P. e. lusitanicus Kulczyński, 1911 — Portugal
 P. epigynatus Strand, 1909 — South Africa
 P. erythrops Caporiacco, 1933 — Libya
 P. exilis Banks, 1892 — USA, Canada
 P. femurostriatus Muster, 2009 — Greece, Turkey
 P. floridensis Banks, 1904 — USA
 P. foucauldi Denis, 1954 — Algeria
 P. frontosus Simon, 1897 — India
 P. fuscolimbatus Lucas, 1846 — Mediterranean
 P. fuscomarginatus (De Geer, 1778) — Europe, Russia (Europe to Far East)
 P. gertschi Schick, 1965 — USA
 P. grazianii Caporiacco, 1933 — Libya
 P. grosi Lessert, 1943 — Congo
 P. guineensis Millot, 1942 — Guinea, Ivory Coast
 P. guiyang Long & Yu, 2022 — China
 P. gyirongensis Hu, 2001 — China
 P. hadzii Šilhavý, 1944 — North Macedonia
 P. harrietae Dondale & Redner, 1969 — USA
 P. hiulcus (Pavesi, 1883) — Ethiopia, Somalia
 P. humilis Kroneberg, 1875 — Tajikistan
 P. imbecillus Keyserling, 1880 — USA, Canada
 P. immaculatus Denis, 1955 — Niger
 P. infectus Dondale & Redner, 1969 — Mexico
 P. infuscatus Keyserling, 1880 — USA, Canada
 P. i. utus Chamberlin, 1921 — USA
 P. insperatus Schick, 1965 — USA, Canada
 P. insulanus Kulczyński, 1905 — Madeira
 P. jabalpurensis Gajbe & Gajbe, 1999 — India
 P. jimredneri Jiménez, 1989 — Mexico
 P. johani Muster, 2009 — Greece
 P. josemitensis Gertsch, 1934 — USA, Canada
 P. juvencus Kulczyński, 1895 — Armenia
 P. kalliaensis Levy, 1977 — Israel
 P. ketani Gajbe, 2005 — India
 P. keyserlingi Marx, 1890 — USA, Canada
 P. kianganensis Barrion & Litsinger, 1995 — Philippines
 P. kraepelini Simon, 1905 — Indonesia (Java)
 P. krausi Muster & Thaler, 2004 — Albania, Greece, Turkey
 P. laricium Simon, 1875 — Spain, France, Italy, Switzerland, Austria, Germany
 P. lasaensis Yin, Peng, Bao & Kim, 2000 — China
 P. laticeps Keyserling, 1880 — USA
 P. latrophagus Levy, 1999 — Israel, United Arab Emirates
 P. legae Caporiacco, 1941 — Ethiopia
 P. lhasana Hu, 2001 — China
 P. lividus Simon, 1875 — Portugal, France, Morocco, Algeria, Italy, Croatia
 P. longiductus Dondale & Redner, 1969 — Costa Rica
 P. longipalpis Simon, 1870 — Europe, Iran, Azerbaijan
 P. lugens (O. Pickard-Cambridge, 1876) — Egypt
 P. lunatus Muster & Thaler, 2004 — Croatia, Albania, Greece, Cyprus, Turkey
 P. luteovirescens Urquhart, 1893 — Australia (Tasmania)
 P. lutulentus Gertsch, 1934 — USA
 P. maculatovittatus Strand, 1906 — Ethiopia
 P. maestrii Caporiacco, 1941 — Ethiopia
 P. maghrebi Muster, 2009 — Algeria
 P. maliniae Tikader, 1966 — India
 P. manikae Tikader, 1971 — India
 P. margaritatus (Clerck, 1757) — Europe, Turkey, Caucasus, Russia (Europe to Far East), Kazakhstan, Iran, Korea, Japan
 P. marginellus Banks, 1901 — USA, Mexico
 P. marmoratus Kulczyński, 1891 — Austria, Czechia to Bulgaria, Ukraine
 P. marusiki (Logunov, 1997) — Russia (West and South Siberia), Mongolia
 P. marxi Keyserling, 1884 — USA
 P. mediocris Gertsch, 1934 — USA
 P. melanostomus Thorell, 1895 — Myanmar
 P. mexicanus Dondale & Redner, 1969 — Mexico
 P. mineri Gertsch, 1933 — USA
 P. minutus Banks, 1892 — USA, Canada
 P. mississippianus Dondale & Redner, 1969 — USA
 P. mohiniae Tikader, 1966 — India
 P. molarius L. Koch, 1879 — Kazakhstan
 P. monitae Muster & Van Keer, 2010 — Bulgaria, Greece
 P. montanus Bryant, 1933 — USA
 P. morsus Karsch, 1884 — West Africa
 P. multispinus Caporiacco, 1933 — Libya
 P. musteri Lecigne & Oger, 2020 — Turkey
 P. nigrostriatipes Bösenberg & Strand, 1906 — Japan
 P. niveus Vinson, 1863 — Madagascar
 P. oneida Levi, 1951 — USA, Canada
 P. orarius Schick, 1965 — USA, Mexico
 P. orientalis Schenkel, 1963 — China
 P. otjimbumbe Lawrence, 1927 — Namibia
 P. pali Gajbe & Gajbe, 2001 — India
 P. panganii Caporiacco, 1947 — East Africa
 P. parietalis Simon, 1875 — Spain, France
 P. partitus Lessert, 1919 — East Africa
 P. pawani Gajbe, 2005 — India
 P. pelagonus Šilhavý, 1944 — North Macedonia
 P. peninsulanus Gertsch, 1934 — USA, Canada
 P. pentheri Muster, 2009 — Albania, Azerbaijan
 P. pericu Jiménez, 1989 — Mexico
 P. pernix Blackwall, 1846 — USA, Canada
 P. pesbovis Caporiacco, 1949 — Kenya
 P. pinetorum Muster, 2009 — Portugal to Turkey
 P. pinyonelis Schick, 1965 — USA
 P. placidus Banks, 1892 — North America
 P. planus (L. Koch, 1875) — New Guinea, Australia (Queensland)
 P. poecilus (Thorell, 1872) — Europe, Turkey, Caucasus, Russia (Europe to Far East), Central Asia
 P. populicola Denis, 1958 — Afghanistan
 P. praedatus O. Pickard-Cambridge, 1871 — Europe, Russia (Europe to South Siberia), Azerbaijan, Iran
 P. praelustris Keyserling, 1880 — USA, Canada
 P. pratariae (Scheffer, 1904) — USA, Mexico
 P. pratarioides Dondale & Redner, 1969 — Mexico
 P. probolus Dondale & Redner, 1969 — USA
 P. psaronius Dondale & Redner, 1968 — Mexico
 P. pseudanomalus Dondale & Redner, 1969 — Mexico
 P. pseudoexilis Paik, 1979 — Korea
 P. punctatissimus Roewer, 1962 — Afghanistan
 P. punctisternus Caporiacco, 1940 — Ethiopia
 P. pygmaeus Levy, 1977 — Israel
 P. quercicola Schick, 1965 — USA
 P. rajani Gajbe, 2005 — India
 P. renarius Urita & Song, 1987 — China
 P. rodecki Gertsch & Jellison, 1939 — USA, Canada
 P. roseus Kishida, 1914 — Japan
 P. rufus Walckenaer, 1826 — North America, Europe, Turkey, Caucasus, Russia (Europe to Far East), Kazakhstan, Iran, Central Asia, Mongolia, China, Korea, Japan
 P. r. jenningsi Cutler, 2003 — USA
 P. r. pacificus Banks, 1898 — USA, Canada
 P. r. quartus Dondale & Redner, 1968 — North America
 P. r. vibrans Dondale, 1964 — USA, Canada
 P. sanjeevi Gajbe, 2004 — India
 P. satullus Keyserling, 1880 — USA to Costa Rica
 P. schicki Dondale & Redner, 1968 — USA
 P. separatus Dondale & Redner, 1969 — Mexico
 P. shaochui Yin, Peng, Bao & Kim, 2000 — China
 P. shillongensis Tikader, 1962 — India
 P. silvestrii Caporiacco, 1940 — Somalia
 P. simillimus Denis, 1962 — Madeira
 P. speciosus Gertsch, 1934 — USA, Canada
 P. spectabilis Keyserling, 1880 — USA, Canada
 P. spinitarsis Simon, 1895 — Russia (South Siberia, Far East), China, Korea, Japan
 P. splendens Indzhov, 2020 — Bulgaria
 P. sticticus Lucas, 1858 — Gabon
 P. subaureolus Bösenberg & Strand, 1906 — Mongolia, China, Korea, Japan
 P. tabupumensis Petrunkevitch, 1914 — Myanmar
 P. thanatellus Strand, 1909 — South Africa
 P. tiwarii Basu, 1973 — India
 P. tortus Dondale & Redner, 1969 — USA
 P. traviatus Banks, 1929 — Panama, Aruba, Curaçao, Venezuela
 P. undarum Barnes, 1953 — USA
 P. utotchkini Marusik, 1991 — Russia (South Siberia, Far East)
 P. v-notatus Caporiacco, 1947 — Ethiopia
 P. vagulus Simon, 1875 — Europe
 P. validus (Gertsch, 1933) — USA
 P. venustus O. Pickard-Cambridge, 1876 — Egypt
 P. verityi Schick, 1965 — USA
 P. victor Lessert, 1943 — Congo
 P. vinokurovi Marusik, 1991 — Russia (Urals to South Siberia), China
 P. vulgaris (Hentz, 1847) — USA, Canada
 P. vulpio Simon, 1910 — South Africa

Procleocnemis

Procleocnemis Mello-Leitão, 1929
 P. concolor Mello-Leitão, 1929 (type) — Brazil

Psellonus

Psellonus Simon, 1897
 P. planus Simon, 1897 (type) — India

Pseudopsellonus

Pseudopsellonus Balogh, 1936
 P. papuanus Balogh, 1936 (type) — New Guinea

Pulchellodromus

Pulchellodromus Wunderlich, 2012
 P. afroglaucinus (Muster & Bosmans, 2007) — Algeria
 P. bistigma (Simon, 1870) — Mediterranean
 P. glaucinus (Simon, 1870) — Mediterranean
 P. lamellipalpis (Muster, 2007) — Algeria
 P. mainlingensis (Hu & Li, 1987) — Tibet
 P. medius (O. Pickard-Cambridge, 1872) — Italy, Greece, Turkey, Ukraine, Caucasus (Russia, Azerbaijan), Iran
 P. navarrus Kastrygina, Kovblyuk & Polchaninova, 2016 — Spain
 P. pardalis (Muster & Bosmans, 2007) — Portugal, Spain, Algeria to Egypt
 P. pulchellus (Lucas, 1846) (type) — Mediterranean
 P. punctiger (O. Pickard-Cambridge, 1908) — Canary Is., Spain
 P. ruficapillus (Simon, 1885) — Mediterranean to Kazakhstan
 P. simoni (Mello-Leitão, 1929) — Portugal, Spain, Algeria
 P. wunderlichi (Muster & Thaler, 2007) — Canary Is.

R

Rhysodromus

Rhysodromus Schick, 1965
 R. ablegminus (Szita & Logunov, 2008) — Kazakhstan
 R. alascensis (Keyserling, 1884) — North America, Russia (Urals to Far East), Kazakhstan, China
 R. angulobulbis (Szita & Logunov, 2008) — Russia (South Siberia)
 R. caspius (Ponomarev, 2008) — Kazakhstan
 R. cinerascens (O. Pickard-Cambridge, 1885) — China (Yarkand)
 R. fallax (Sundevall, 1833) — Europe, North Africa, Turkey, Caucasus, Russia (Europe to Far East), Kazakhstan, Iran, Central Asia, Mongolia, China
 R. halophilus (Levy, 1977) — Israel
 R. hierosolymitanus (Levy, 1977) — Israel, United Arab Emirates, Iran
 R. hierroensis (Wunderlich, 1992) — Canary Is.
 R. histrio (Latreille, 1819) (type) — North America, Europe, Turkey, Caucasus, Russia (Europe to Far East), Central Asia, China
 R. hui (Yang & Mao, 2002) — China
 R. lanchowensis (Schenkel, 1936) — Russia (West Siberia to Far East), China, Korea, Japan
 R. lepidus (Blackwall, 1870) — Mediterranean to India
 R. leucomarginatus (Paik, 1979) — China, Korea
 R. mysticus (Dondale & Redner, 1975) — Russia (Middle Siberia to Far East), USA, Canada
 R. naxcivanicus (Logunov & Huseynov, 2008) — Azerbaijan
 R. petrobius (Schmidt & Krause, 1995) — Cape Verde Is.
 R. pictus (Kroneberg, 1875) — Central Asia to China
 R. rikhteri (Logunov & Huseynov, 2008) — Armenia, Azerbaijan
 R. signatus (O. Pickard-Cambridge, 1870) — St. Helena
 R. sinaiticus (Levy, 1977) — Egypt
 R. timidus (Szita & Logunov, 2008) — Russia (Caucasus), Kazakhstan, Pakistan
 R. triangulatus (Urita & Song, 1987) — Kazakhstan to China
 R. tuvinensis (Szita & Logunov, 2008) — Russia (West and South Siberia), Kazakhstan, Mongolia
 R. xerophilus (Szita & Logunov, 2008) — Russia (Central Asia, South Siberia), Kazakhstan
 R. xinjiangensis (Tang & Song, 1987) — Azerbaijan, Kazakhstan, Central Asia, China

S

Suemus

Suemus Simon, 1895
 S. atomarius Simon, 1895 (type) — Sierra Leone
 S. orientalis Simon, 1909 — Vietnam
 S. punctatus Lawrence, 1938 — South Africa
 S. tibelliformis Simon, 1909 — Vietnam
 S. tibelloides Caporiacco, 1947 — East Africa

T

Thanatus

Thanatus C. L. Koch, 1837
 T. africanus Karsch, 1878 — Tanzania (Zanzibar), South Africa
 T. albescens O. Pickard-Cambridge, 1885 — China (Yarkand)
 T. altimontis Gertsch, 1933 — USA, Mexico
 T. arcticus Thorell, 1872 — USA (Alaska), Canada, Greenland, Northern Europe, Russia (Europe to Far East), Kazakhstan, China, Japan
 T. arenarius L. Koch, 1872 — Europe to Iran
 T. arenicola (Schmidt, 1976) — Canary Is.
 T. aridorum Šilhavý, 1940 — Czechia
 T. atlanticus Berland, 1936 — Cape Verde Is.
 T. atratus Simon, 1875 — Europe, Turkey, Caucasus, Russia (Europe to South Siberia), Kazakhstan, Iran, Korea, Japan
 T. balestrerii Caporiacco, 1935 — Karakorum
 T. bungei (Kulczyński, 1908) — Russia (Urals to Far East), Japan, North America
 T. chorillensis Keyserling, 1880 — Peru
 T. coloradensis Keyserling, 1880 — North America, Europe, Russia (Caucasus to Far East), Kazakhstan, China
 T. coreanus Paik, 1979 — Russia (South Siberia, Far East), Korea, China
 T. cronebergi Simon, 1895 — Mongolia
 T. dahurianus Logunov, 1997 — Russia (South Siberia)
 T. damingus Wang, Zhang & Xing, 2013 — China
 T. denisi Brignoli, 1983 — Afghanistan
 T. dhakuricus Tikader, 1960 — India
 T. dissimilis Denis, 1960 — France
 T. dorsilineatus Jézéquel, 1964 — Ivory Coast
 T. fabricii (Audouin, 1826) — Canary Is., Northern Africa, Portugal, Spain, Greece (Crete), Turkey, Caucasus, Middle East, Iran, Kazakhstan, Central Asia
 T. firmetorum Muster & Thaler, 2003 — Switzerland, Germany, Austria, Italy
 T. flavescens O. Pickard-Cambridge, 1876 — Egypt
 T. flavidus Simon, 1875 — Greece, Ukraine, Russia (Europe)
 T. flavus O. Pickard-Cambridge, 1876 — Egypt
 T. forbesi Pocock, 1903 — Yemen (Socotra)
 T. forciformis Li, Feng & Yang, 2013 — China
 T. formicinus (Clerck, 1757) (type) — North America, Europe, North Africa, Turkey, Caucasus, Russia (Europe to Far East), Iran, Kazakhstan, Central Asia, China, Japan
 T. fornicatus Simon, 1897 — Egypt (Sinai) to Pakistan
 T. frederici Denis, 1941 — Cape Verde Is.
 T. fuscipes Denis, 1937 — Algeria
 T. f. concolor Denis, 1957 — Spain
 T. gnaquiensis Strand, 1908 — Peru
 T. granadensis Keyserling, 1880 — Colombia
 T. hongkong Song, Zhu & Wu, 1997 — China
 T. imbecillus L. Koch, 1878 — Greece, North Macedonia, Bulgaria, Ukraine, Caucasus, Russia (Europe, Urals), Iran, Central Asia
 T. inconsuetus Caporiacco, 1940 — Ethiopia
 T. indicus Simon, 1885 — India
 T. jabalpurensis Gajbe & Gajbe, 1999 — India
 T. jaikensis Ponomarev, 2007 — Kazakhstan
 T. ketani Bhandari & Gajbe, 2001 — India
 T. kitabensis Charitonov, 1946 — Azerbaijan, Russia (West Siberia), Iran, Kazakhstan, Central Asia
 T. lamottei Jézéquel, 1964 — Ivory Coast
 T. lanatus Logunov, 1996 — Russia (Far East)
 T. lanceolatus Simon, 1875 — Ukraine
 T. lanceoletus Tikader, 1966 — India
 T. lesserti (Roewer, 1951) — Turkey, Egypt to Iran
 T. lineatipes Simon, 1870 — Mediterranean, Georgia
 T. luederitzi Simon, 1910 — Namibia
 T. maculatus Keyserling, 1880 — Peru
 T. mandali Tikader, 1965 — India
 T. meronensis Levy, 1977 — Israel
 T. mikhailovi Logunov, 1996 — Russia (Europe to South Siberia), Kazakhstan, Central Asia
 T. miniaceus Simon, 1880 — Mongolia, China, Taiwan, Korea, Japan
 T. mongolicus (Schenkel, 1936) — Ukraine, Russia (Europe), Kazakhstan, Mongolia, China
 T. mus Strand, 1908 — Peru
 T. namaquensis Simon, 1910 — South Africa
 T. neimongol Urita & Song, 1987 — China
 T. nentwigi Wunderlich, 2017 — Nigeria
 T. nigromaculatus Kulczyński, 1885 — Russia (Kamchatka)
 T. nipponicus Yaginuma, 1969 — Russia (Far East), Mongolia, China, Korea, Japan
 T. nodongensis Kim & Kim, 2012 — Korea
 T. oblongiusculus (Lucas, 1846) — Southern Europe, Turkey, North Africa, Ukraine, Russia (Europe) to Central Asia, Iran, China
 T. o. atomarius (Simon, 1932) — France
 T. okayi Karol, 1966 — Turkey
 T. ornatus (Lucas, 1846) — Algeria
 T. pagenstecheri Strand, 1906 — Namibia
 T. parangvulgaris Barrion & Litsinger, 1995 — Thailand
 T. philodromicus Strand, 1916 — Madagascar
 T. philodromoides Caporiacco, 1940 — Somalia
 T. pictus L. Koch, 1881 — Europe, Turkey, Caucasus, Russia (Europe to West Siberia), Kazakhstan, Iran
 T. pinnatus Jézéquel, 1964 — Ivory Coast
 T. plumosus Simon, 1890 — Yemen
 T. pollex Li, Feng & Yang, 2013 — China
 T. prolixus Simon, 1897 — India
 T. pygmaeus Schmidt & Krause, 1996 — Canary Is.
 T. rayi Simon, 1875 — Europe to Kazakhstan
 T. roseofemoralis (Karsch, 1879) — Japan
 T. rubicellus Mello-Leitão, 1929 — USA, Canada
 T. rubicundus L. Koch, 1875 — Ethiopia, Somalia, East Africa
 T. sabulosus (Menge, 1875) — Europe, Turkey, Caucasus, Russia (Europe to Far East), Kazakhstan
 T. saraevi Ponomarev, 2007 — Kazakhstan, Iran, Pakistan, Uzbekistan
 T. schubotzi Strand, 1913 — Central Africa
 T. sepiacolor Levy, 1999 — Israel, United Arab Emirates
 T. setiger (O. Pickard-Cambridge, 1872) — Israel, United Arab Emirates, Iran
 T. sibiricus Kulczyński, 1901 — Russia (South Siberia)
 T. simplicipalpis Simon, 1882 — Yemen, India
 T. stepposus Logunov, 1996 — Russia (South Siberia), China
 T. striatus C. L. Koch, 1845 — North America, Europe, Turkey, Russia (Europe to Far East), Kazakhstan, Iran, Central Asia
 T. stripatus Tikader, 1980 — India
 T. tuvinensis Logunov, 1996 — Russia (South to north-eastern Siberia), Kyrgyzstan
 T. ubsunurensis Logunov, 1996 — Russia (South Siberia)
 T. validus Simon, 1875 — Algeria
 T. vulgaris Simon, 1870 — North America, Europe, North Africa, Turkey, Israel, Caucasus, Russia (Europe to Far East), Iran, Kazakhstan, Central Asia, China, Korea
 T. v. creticus Kulczyński, 1903 — Greece (Crete)
 T. wuchuanensis Tang & Wang, 2008 — China
 T. xinjiangensis Hu & Wu, 1989 — China
 T. zavattarii Caporiacco, 1939 — Ethiopia

Tibellus

Tibellus Simon, 1875
 T. affinis O. Pickard-Cambridge, 1898 — Mexico
 T. armatus Lessert, 1928 — Central, Southern Africa
 T. asiaticus Kulczyński, 1908 — Russia (Middle Siberia to Far East), North America
 T. aspersus Danilov, 1991 — Russia (South Siberia, Far East)
 T. australis (Simon, 1910) — Botswana
 T. bruneitarsis Lawrence, 1952 — Zimbabwe, South Africa
 T. californicus Schick, 1965 — USA
 T. chamberlini Gertsch, 1933 — USA, Canada
 T. chaturshingi Tikader, 1962 — India
 T. chilensis Mello-Leitão, 1943 — Chile
 T. cobusi Van den Berg & Dippenaar-Schoeman, 1994 — East, Southern Africa
 T. cucurbitus Yang, Zhu & Song, 2005 — China
 T. demangei Jézéquel, 1964 — Ivory Coast, South Africa
 T. duttoni (Hentz, 1847) — USA, Mexico
 T. elongatus Tikader, 1960 — India
 T. fengi Efimik, 1999 — Russia (Far East), China, Japan
 T. flavipes Caporiacco, 1939 — East, Southern Africa
 T. gerhardi Van den Berg & Dippenaar-Schoeman, 1994 — East, Southern Africa
 T. hollidayi Lawrence, 1952 — East, Southern Africa
 T. insularis Gertsch, 1933 — Cuba
 T. jabalpurensis Gajbe & Gajbe, 1999 — India
 T. japonicus Efimik, 1999 — Russia (Far East), China, Japan
 T. katrajghatus Tikader, 1962 — India
 T. kibonotensis Lessert, 1919 — East, Southern Africa
 T. kimi Kim & Seong, 2015 — Korea
 T. macellus Simon, 1875 — Europe, Turkey, Caucasus, Russia (Europe to Far East), Kazakhstan
 T. m. georgicus Mcheidze, 1997 — Georgia
 T. maritimus (Menge, 1875) — North America, Europe, Caucasus, Russia (Europe to Far East), Central Asia, China
 T. minor Lessert, 1919 — Africa
 T. nigeriensis Millot, 1942 — Mali
 T. nimbaensis Van den Berg & Dippenaar-Schoeman, 1994 — Guinea
 T. oblongus (Walckenaer, 1802) (type) — North America, Europe, North Africa, Turkey, Israel, Caucasus, Russia (Europe to Far East), Kzakhstan, Iran, Central Asia, Mongolia, China, Korea, Japan
 T. o. maculatus Caporiacco, 1950 — Italy
 T. orientis Efimik, 1999 — Russia (South Siberia, Far East), China
 T. paraguensis Simon, 1897 — Paraguay, Bolivia, Argentina
 T. pashanensis Tikader, 1980 — India
 T. pateli Tikader, 1980 — India
 T. poonaensis Tikader, 1962 — India
 T. propositus Roewer, 1951 — China (Yarkand)
 T. rothi Schick, 1965 — USA
 T. septempunctatus Millot, 1942 — Guinea
 T. seriepunctatus Simon, 1907 — Africa
 T. shikerpurensis Biswas & Raychaudhuri, 2003 — Bangladesh
 T. somaliensis Van den Berg & Dippenaar-Schoeman, 1994 — Somalia, Zimbabwe
 T. spinosus Schiapelli & Gerschman, 1941 — Argentina
 T. sunetae Van den Berg & Dippenaar-Schoeman, 1994 — Southern Africa
 T. tenellus (L. Koch, 1876) — Australia
 T. utotchkini Ponomarev, 2008 — France, Romania, Moldova, Russia (Europe, Caucasus)
 T. vitilis Simon, 1906 — India, Sri Lanka
 T. vossioni Simon, 1884 — Saudi Arabia, Africa
 T. zhui Tang & Song, 1989 — China

Tibitanus

Tibitanus Simon, 1907
 T. nomas Simon, 1910 — Namibia
 T. sexlineatus Simon, 1907 (type) — Guinea-Bissau, Guinea

Titanebo

Titanebo Gertsch, 1933
 T. albocaudatus (Schick, 1965) — USA, Mexico
 T. andreaannae (Schick, 1965) — USA
 T. californicus Gertsch, 1933 — USA
 T. cantralli (Sauer & Platnick, 1972) — USA
 T. creosotis (Schick, 1965) — USA
 T. dispar (Schick, 1965) — USA
 T. dondalei (Sauer, 1968) — USA, Mexico
 T. macyi Gertsch, 1933 (type) — USA
 T. magnificus Chamberlin & Ivie, 1942 — USA
 T. mexicanus (Banks, 1898) — USA, Mexico
 T. oblongus (Simon, 1895) — USA
 T. parabolis (Schick, 1965) — USA
 T. redneri (Cokendolpher, 1978) — USA
 T. texanus Gertsch, 1933 — USA

V

Vacchellia

Vacchellia Caporiacco, 1935
 V. baltoroi Caporiacco, 1935 (type) — Karakorum

References

Philodromidae